Middletown is a town in northwest Henry County, Indiana, United States. The population was 2,322 at the 2010 census.

History 
Middletown was platted in 1829. The town's name is locational, for it lies halfway between New Castle and Anderson. A post office was established at Middletown in 1830. Middletown was incorporated as a town in 1840.

The John W. Hedrick House and Middletown Commercial Historic District are listed on the National Register of Historic Places.

Geography 
Middletown is located at  (40.057094, -85.541098).

Demographics

2010 census 
As of the 2010 United States Census, there were 2,322 people, 894 households, and 594 families in the town. The racial makeup of the town was 97.6% White, 0.3% African American, 0.1% Native American, 0.5% Asian, 0.2% from other races, and 1.3% from two or more races. Hispanic or Latino of any race were 0.8% of the population.

There were 894 households, of which 37.5% had children under the age of 18 living with them, 42.8% were married couples living together, 17.7% had a female householder with no husband present, 5.9% had a male householder with no wife present, and 33.6% were non-families. 27.7% of all households were made up of individuals, and 10.6% had someone living alone who was 65 years of age or older. The average household size was 2.51 and the average family size was 3.02.

The median age in the town was 36.6 years. 27.8% of residents were under the age of 18; 9% were between the ages of 18 and 24; 24.9% were from 25 to 44; 22.6% were from 45 to 64; and 15.6% were 65 years of age or older. The gender makeup of the town was 46.8% male and 53.2% female.

2000 census 
As of the 2000 United States Census, there were 2,488 people, 984 households, and 651 families in the town. The racial makeup of the town was 98.31% White, 0.48% African American, 0.28% Native American, 0.28% Asian, 0.04% from other races, and 0.60% from two or more races. Hispanic or Latino of any race were 0.28% of the population.

There were 984 households, out of which 36.3% had children under the age of 18 living with them, 48.0% were married couples living together, 14.2% had a female householder with no husband present, and 33.8% were non-families. 29.0% of all households were made up of individuals, and 13.2% had someone living alone who was 65 years of age or older. The average household size was 2.43 and the average family size was 2.99.

The town population contained 28.3% under the age of 18, 8.2% from 18 to 24, 29.5% from 25 to 44, 19.8% from 45 to 64, and 14.3% who were 65 years of age or older. The median age was 34 years. For every 100 females, there were 86.5 males. For every 100 females age 18 and over, there were 80.9 males.

The median income for a household in the town was $32,591, and the median income for a family was $39,922. Males had a median income of $33,152 versus $20,188 for females. The per capita income for the town was $16,017. About 7.4% of families and 8.2% of the population were below the poverty line, including 9.8% of those under age 18 and 3.3% of those age 65 or over.

Education 
The Shenandoah School Corporation provides education at Shenandoah High School, Shenandoah Middle School and Shenandoah Elementary School in Middletown.

The town has a lending library, the Middletown Fall Creek Township Public Library.

Notable people 
 John Hazelton Cotteral (1864−1933) − United States district and appellate judge
 Norman "Norm" Day (b. ca. 1939) − professional race car driver
 Mikel Harry (1951−2017) − father of six sigma
 Beth Solomon (b. 1952) − professional golfer.

References

External links 
 Town of Middletown, Indiana website
 Henry County Convention and Visitors Bureau map of Middletown, Indiana
 Henry County Convention and Visitors Bureau, Henry County's Official Visitors Information Website, for the cities and towns of: New Castle, Knightstown & Middletown, Indiana
https
Towns in Henry County, Indiana 

Towns in Indiana

://www.heraldbulletin.com/news/local_news/filmmaker-finds-norman-days-station-has-the-right-look/article_d53ae1e6-3327-51f8-9022-783d2a67367e.html